Pierre Laurent may refer to:
Pierre Laurent (politician) (born 1957), French politician and journalist
Pierre Alphonse Laurent (1813–1854), French mathematician
Pierre Laurent (footballer) (born 1970), French footballer